Pasquali Film was an Italian film production company of the silent era. Founded in 1909 in Turin by  Ernesto Maria Pasquali, it was later merged into the Unione Cinematografica Italiana in 1919, before closing completely in 1924. It enjoyed its greatest period of success before the First World War. In 1910, it hired the French comedian Ferdinand Guillaume who starred in a series of short comedies.

References

Bibliography
 Robert Stam & Alessandra Raengo. A Companion to Literature and Film. John Wiley & Sons, 2008.

Film production companies of Italy